The Palestinian National and Islamic Forces is a coalition formed shortly after the outbreak of the second Intifada with the authorization of Yasser Arafat and led by Marwan Barghouti. The coalition coordinates the agenda of its members and helps plan and execute joint political actions against Israel. According to the Anti-Defamation League, the group enjoyed significant influence during the second intifada, but since the election of Mahmoud Abbas in 2005 it has been less active.

The coalition includes both PLO and non-PLO factions, some organizations are listed as terrorist in the West. 

The group's committee includes representatives of the following organizations:
Palestinian National Liberation Movement (Fatah);
Popular Front for the Liberation of Palestine (PFLP); 
Islamic Resistance Movement (Hamas); 
Democratic Front for the Liberation of Palestine (DFLP); 
Palestinian People's Party (PPP); 
Palestinian Democratic Union (FIDA); 
Palestinian Popular Struggle Front (PPSF, Khalid ‘Abd al-Majid faction); 
Palestinian Liberation Front (PLF); 
Islamic Jihad Movement in Palestine (PIJ); 
Arab Liberation Front (ALF); 
Palestinian Arab Front (PAF); 
Popular Front for the Liberation of Palestine – General Command (PFLP-GC);
Islamic National Salvation Party; 
Popular Liberation War Pioneers (As-Sa'iqa)
Palestine13 (P13);

References

See also
Israeli–Palestinian conflict
Arab nationalism in the Palestinian territories
Arab nationalist militant groups
Arab nationalist political parties
Democratic Front for the Liberation of Palestine
Hamas
Islamic Jihad Movement in Palestine
Organizations associated with the Ba'ath Party
Palestinian militant groups
Palestinian nationalist parties
Political party alliances in the Palestinian territories
Popular Front for the Liberation of Palestine
Second Intifada
2000 establishments in the Palestinian territories